Edmund Eugene Malanowicz (December 30, 1910 – September 5, 1967) was an American professional basketball player and coach. He played in the National Basketball League for the Buffalo Bisons during the 1937–38 season and averaged 7.2 points per game. He served as the head coach for the Rochester Royals from 1945–46 through 1947–48, then as an assistant from 1948–49 through 1950–51. During this time, the Royals transitioned from the NBL to the BAA to the NBA.

Head coaching record

|- style="background:#FDE910;"
| align="left" |Rochester
| align="left" |1945–46
| 34||24||10||||align="center" |2nd in Eastern||7||6||1|||| align="center" |Won NBL Championship
|-
| align="left" |Rochester
| align="left" |1946–47
| 44||31||13||||align="center" |1st in Eastern||10||6||4|||| align="center" |Lost in NBL Finals
|-
| align="left" |Rochester
| align="left" |1947–48
| 60||44||16||||align="center" |1st in Eastern||10||6||4|||| align="center" |Lost in NBL Finals
|-
|-class="sortbottom"
| align="center" colspan="2"|Total
| 138||99||39|||| ||27||18||9||||

References

1910 births
1967 deaths
American men's basketball players
Basketball coaches from New York (state)
Basketball players from Buffalo, New York
Buffalo Bisons (NBL) players
Buffalo Bulls football players
Buffalo Bulls men's basketball players
Centers (basketball)
High school basketball coaches in the United States
Rochester Royals coaches
Rochester Royals head coaches
Sportspeople from Buffalo, New York